A Fool and His Money is a 1925 silent film starring William Haines and Madge Bellamy and is based on a novel by George Barr McCutcheon.  The film was directed by Erle C. Kenton and was filmed before in 1920. That version starred Eugene O'Brien and Rubye De Remer.

It was remade as a sound film A Royal Romance in 1930.

References

External links
 

1925 films
American black-and-white films
American silent feature films
Films directed by Erle C. Kenton
1925 romantic drama films
Columbia Pictures films
Lost American films
American romantic drama films
Films set in Europe
Lost romantic drama films
1920s American films
Silent romantic drama films
Silent American drama films